Rafael Augusto Filizzola Serra (born 16 February 1968 in Asunción) is a Paraguayan politician. He served as the Paraguayan interior minister under President Fernando Lugo from 2008 to 2011. He was a member of the Chamber of Deputies of Paraguay from 1998 to 2008 for the Party for a Country of Solidarity, and elected to the Senate of Paraguay for the Democratic Progressive Party in 2008. He resigned his seat in order to become interior minister.

In 2009, he accused Federico Acuña (who in 2011 would become his successor), of turning a blind eye to corruption during Acuña's period in office in 2008 as National Police Chief.

Filizzola is married to Desirée Masi, the leader of the Democratic Progressive Party. Filizzola is the cousin of Carlos Filizzola, also a Paraguayan politician.

References

1968 births
Living people
People from Asunción
Paraguayan people of Italian descent
Party for a Country of Solidarity politicians
Progressive Democratic Party (Paraguay) politicians
Interior Ministers of Paraguay
Members of the Chamber of Deputies of Paraguay
Members of the Senate of Paraguay
20th-century Paraguayan lawyers
Universidad Católica Nuestra Señora de la Asunción alumni